Thomas Parsons may refer to:

 Thomas Parsons (baseball) (born 1995), American baseball player
 Thomas Parsons (politician) (1814–1873), American politician from New York
 Thomas Parsons (priest), Irish Anglican priest
 Thomas William Parsons (1819–1892), American dentist and poet

See also
Tom Parsons (disambiguation)